Trupanea bisreducta is a species of tephritid or fruit flies in the genus Trupanea of the family Tephritidae.

Distribution
Namibia, Zimbabwe, South Africa.

References

Tephritinae
Insects described in 1924
Diptera of Africa
Taxa named by Mario Bezzi